The men's team sprint competition at the 2018 UEC European Track Championships was held on 3 August 2018.

Results

Qualifying
The eight fastest teams advanced to the first round.

First round
First round heats were held as follows:
Heat 1: 4th v 5th fastest
Heat 2: 3rd v 6th fastest
Heat 3: 2nd v 7th fastest
Heat 4: 1st v 8th fastest

The heat winners were ranked on time, from which the top 2 proceeded to the gold medal final and the other 2 proceeded to the bronze medal final.

 QG = qualified for gold medal final
 QB = qualified for bronze medal final

Finals

References

Men's team sprint
European Track Championships – Men's team sprint